Lucky Guy may refer to:

 Lucky Guy (play), a 2013 Broadway play by Nora Ephron; her final work
 Lucky Guy (musical), a 2011 Off Broadway musical comedy by Willard Beckham
 "Lucky Guy" (Dieter Bohlen song), a 1985 song by Modern Talking from The 1st Album
 "Lucky Guy" (Kim Hyun-joong song), 2012
 The Lucky Guy, a 1998 Hong Kong comedy film